Kais or KAIS may refer to:

Places
Kais, Khenchela, a town in Algeria
Kaïs District
Kai Islands, an island group in Indonesia

People
 Angela Kais, Malaysian former footballer
 Kaarel Kais, Estonian volleyball player
 Kristjan Kais, Estonian beach volleyball player
 Kais Dukes, British computer scientist and software developer
 Kais Nashef, Palestinian and German actor
 Kais Saied, president of Tunisia
 Kais Yâakoubi, Tunisian former footballer

Other uses 
Kais language
 KAIS International School
 KYKL (FM), a radio station (90.7 FM) licensed to serve Tracy, California, United States, which held the call sign KAIS from 2010 to 2016
 KAKI (FM), a radio station (88.1 FM) licensed to serve Juneau, Alaska, United States, which held the call sign KAIS from 2008 to 2010

See also
Kai (disambiguation)

Arabic masculine given names
Estonian-language surnames